C. Michael Ryer (born September 5, 1949) is a Canadian lawyer and former judge serving on the Canadian Federal Court of Appeal.

History

C. Michael Ryer was reappointed as a judge of the Canadian Federal Court of Appeal on December 12, 2014.   Ryer previously served on the Federal Court of Appeal from October, 2006 to December, 2009.  Prior to his initial appointment, Ryer had practised income tax law with Bennett Jones LLP.  Upon leaving the judiciary, Ryer practised with Deloitte Tax Law LLP in Calgary.|

Ryer earned Bachelor of Arts (1970) and Bachelor of Laws (1973) degrees from the University of Saskatchewan.  He was admitted to the Bar of Saskatchewan in 1975 and the Bar of Alberta in 1977. He earned a Master of Laws degree from the University of Toronto in 1979.

Ryer was reappointed to replace Judge Karen Sharlow, who retired in September 2014.  He resigned on May 1, 2016, and was replaced on June 17, 2016 by Judith M. Woods, a former judge of the Tax Court of Canada.

References

1949 births
Living people
Judges of the Federal Court of Appeal (Canada)